Shanti Pahadia (1 August 1934 – 23 May 2021) was an Indian politician.

Biography
She was a Member of Parliament, representing Rajasthan in the Rajya Sabha the upper house of India's Parliament as a member of the Indian National Congress.

Pahadia died from COVID-19, four days after her husband died from the virus.

References

1934 births
2021 deaths
Rajya Sabha members from Rajasthan
Indian National Congress politicians from Rajasthan
Women in Rajasthan politics
Women members of the Rajya Sabha
Deaths from the COVID-19 pandemic in India